The 2018 Nobel Prize in Literature was awarded the Polish writer Olga Tokarczuk (born 1962) "for a narrative imagination that with encyclopedic passion represents the crossing of boundaries as a form of life." The prize was announced the following year by the Swedish Academy on 10 October 2019. Tokarczuk is the sixth Nobel laureate in Literature from Poland after the poet Wisława Szymborska in 1996, and Czesław Miłosz in 1980.

Laureate

Olga Tokarczuk is inspired by maps and a perspective from above, which tends to make her microcosmos a mirror of macrocosmos. She constructs her novels in a tension between cultural opposites: nature versus culture, reason versus madness, male versus female, home versus alienation. Her magnum opus so far is the historical novel Ksiegi Jakubowe ("The Books of Jacob", 2014), portraying the 18th-century mystic and sect leader Jacob Frank. The work also gives us a remarkably rich panorama of an almost neglected chapter in European history. Among her other significant novels include Prawiek i inne czasy ("Primeval and Other Times", 1997), Bieguni ("Flights", 2007), and Prowadź swój pług przez kości umarłych ("Drive Your Plow Over the Bones of the Dead", 2009).

Reactions

Personal reactions
Tokarczuk received the news from the Swedish Academy while driving on a book tour in Germany for the launch the German version of The Books of Jacob. Interviewed by Adam Smith, Chief Scientific Officer of Nobel Media, on 10 October 2019, asking how she reacted to the news of earning the Nobel Prize in Literature, she responded: 

During Smith's phone call, she spoke of the importance of the 2018 Nobel Prize in Literature as a symbol of hope for those worried about the "crisis in democracy" she sees facing central Europe. She also expressed her happiness winning alongside the controversial Austrian author Peter Handke.

International reactions

The choice of Olga Tokarczuk as Nobel Prize Laureate was generally well received. "The Swedish Academy has made many mistakes in recent years", wrote Claire Armitstead, "but in the Polish writer Olga Tokarczuk, it has found not only a fine winner but a culturally important one." Jennifer Croft, who translated Tokarczuk's novel Flights expressed her delight, saying "I'm so thrilled for Olga and so excited for all the new readers who are bound to discover her delicate, powerful, beautifully nuanced novels and short stories thanks to the prize."

In Poland, there was a division after Tokarczuk's win. Tokarczuk outraged rightwing patriots by saying that, contrary to its self-image as a plucky survivor of oppression, Poland itself had committed “horrendous acts” of colonisation at times in its history. Henceforth, she was branded a targowiczanin (traitor) and vilified by right-wing nationalists, among them the national-conservative political party Law and Justice. Krystyna Sliwinska, a Law and Justice councilwoman in Kłodzko, once questioned Tokarczuk's view of Polish history saying: "Who invented the history of Poland that you question? What are those false facts? Ms. Tokarczuk speaks on behalf of all Poles as 'we', but what right does she have to generalize like that? This false message is translated into foreign languages and goes out into the world and the awards follow." Despite the backlash, some politicians welcomed happily the news and celebrated the announcement. Jacek Czaputowicz, Poland's Minister of Foreign Affairs, congratulated her: "We sincerely congratulate Ms. Olga Tokarczuk, an unquestioned ambassador of Polish culture."

Award ceremony

Nobel lecture
In her Nobel lecture The Tender Narrator, delivered at the Swedish Academy on 7 December 2019, Olga Tokarczuk spoke about her belief in the power of literature in a world of information overload and divisive narratives. According to her, literature is 

The lecture was named "Emerging Europe's Artistic Achievement 2020" by the organization Emerging Europe.

Prize presentation
At the prize presentation on 10 December 2019, Per Wästberg, member of the Swedish Academy, said of Tokarczuk:

Banquet speech
According to Tokarczuk in her banquet speech, she did not know how the Nobel celebrations are being held annually at Stockholm. Wanting to learn something about the event, she came upon Björn Runge's film The Wife which features the story of an American novelist's wife who questions her life choices and who is later revealed to be the secret behind the his husband's Nobel Prize success, being the true author of his acclaimed novels. Tokarczuk immediately clarifies, causing her audience to laugh, that her winning was nothing similar to the film by saying: "No, no, please don't worry – I can solemnly declare that I wrote all my own books myself." Though, she agrees that the laureates' success are greatly rooted in the people who supported, helped and inspired them. "The movie demonstrates a particular phenomenon," she said "which is that prizes treat their laureates as individuals, by ascribing one-hundred-percent of the merit to them. When in fact there are always lots of other people behind their success – those who support, help and inspire." She concluded her speech by stating:

Other Nobel-related events

Academy scandal and award postponement

In April 2018, three Swedish Academy members (Klas Östergren, Kjell Espmark, and Peter Englund) resigned in response to a sexual-misconduct investigation involving author Jean-Claude Arnault, who is married to the member Katarina Frostenson. Arnault was accused of sexual assault and harassment by at least 18 women. He and his wife were also accused of leaking the names of prize recipients on at least seven occasions so friends could profit from online bets. He denied all accusations, although he was later convicted of rape and sentenced to two years and six months in prison.  Sara Danius, the permanent secretary, hired a law firm to investigate if Frostenson had violated the Academy's regulations by leaking any confidential information and whether Arnault had any influence on the Academy, but no legal action was taken. The investigation caused a division among the members of the Academy. Following a vote to stop Frostenson's membership, the three members resigned in protest over the decisions made by the Academy. Two former permanent secretaries, Sture Allén and Horace Engdahl, called Danius a weak leader.

On 10 April, Danius was requested to resign from her position by the Academy, bringing the number of empty seats to four. Although the Academy voted against removing Katarina Frostenson from the committee, she voluntarily agreed to withdraw from participating in the academy, bringing the total of withdrawals to five. Because two other seats were still vacant from the Rushdie affair, this left only 11 active members. On 4 May 2018, the Swedish Academy announced that the selection would be postponed until 2019, when two laureates would be chosen. It was still technically possible to choose a 2018 laureate, as only eight active members are required to choose a recipient. However, there were concerns that the academy was not in any condition to credibly present the award.

The scandal was widely seen as damaging to the credibility of the prize and its authority. As noted by Andrew Brown in The Guardian in a lengthy deconstruction of the scandal: 

King Carl XVI Gustaf of Sweden said a reform of the rules may be evaluated, including the introduction of the right to resign in respect of the current lifelong membership of the committee. On 5 March 2019, it was announced that the Nobel Prize in Literature would once again be awarded, and laureates for both 2018 and 2019 would be announced together. The decision came after several changes were made to the structure of the Swedish Academy as well as to the Nobel Committee members selection, in order to "[restore] trust in the Academy as a prize-awarding institution". On 19 November, the Swedish Academy added five temporary external members to help its five-strong Nobel Committee in their deliberations for the 2019 and 2020 awards: author and literary translator Gun-Britt Sundstrom; publisher Henrik Petersen; and literary critics Mikaela Blomqvist, Rebecka Karde and Kristoffer Leandoer. Just after two weeks, two of the newly added external members, Sundstrom and Leandoer, left the committee, with the latter saying the work to reform the scandal-hit Swedish Academy was taking too long. "I leave my job in the Nobel Committee because I have neither the patience nor the time to wait for the result of the work to change that has been started," Leandoer said.

New Academy Prize in Literature

The New Academy Prize in Literature, not affiliated with neither the Nobel Foundation or the Swedish Academy, and in no way supported by them was an established as an alternative literary prize. It was started by Ann Pålsson, together with some Swedish librarions, in lieu of the 2018 Nobel Prize in Literature not being awarded and instead postponed until 2019 due to the sexual assault allegations and leakage of confidential information. 

The prize was announced on 12 October 2018 and was awarded to the Guadeloupan-French Maryse Condé, after a democratic nomination of hundreds of Swedish librarians across the country. She was selected out of 47 candidates from around the globe and was among the four finalists (with Neil Gaiman, Haruki Murakami, and Kim Thúy). She received the prize on 10 December 2018 at a ceremony at Berns salonger in Stockholm. The prize sum, 320 000 Swedish crowns, was created through crowdfunding and sponsorship.

The establishment of the prize received several negative reactions in Sweden, but was well received internationally. The New Academy was dissolved immediately after the Prize had been presented to Condé in December 2018.

Nobel Committee
The Swedish Academy's Nobel Committee for the 2018 Nobel Prize in Literature were the following members:

References

External links
Price announcement nobelprize.org
Award Ceremony speech nobelprize.org
Nobel lecture nobelprize.org

2018
Olga Tokarczuk
2018 awards